Ivan William Harbour (born 3 June 1962) is an architect and senior partner at RSHP. He joined the Richard Rogers Partnership in 1985 and by 2007 the name of the practice changed to Rogers Stirk Harbour + Partners in recognition of Graham Stirk and Harbour's contribution to the firm, later renamed RSHP, after the death of Richard Rogers. 

He has been the leading architect on two Stirling Prize winning entries for the practice in 2006 and 2009 for Terminal 4 of Madrid-Barajas Airport and Maggie's Centre, London respectively.

Early life and career

Harbour was born in 1962 in Irvine, Scotland. However he was brought up in the West Country. Harbour joined the Richard Rogers Partnership in 1985 after studying architecture at the Bartlett School of Architecture, University College London, where he obtained a Bachelor of Science degree (BSc (Hons)) during 1980-83 and a Diploma in Architecture (Dipl. Arch.) in 1985.

During 1983 he joined Yorke Rosenberg Mardall (YRM) as part of his studies and in 1984-85 he was with the London Borough of Hackney. After his studies he joined the Richard Rogers Partnership in 1985 and was made a director of in 1993. In 1998 he was made a director of the practice and by 2007 the name of the practice changed from Richard Rogers Partnership to Rogers Stirk Harbour + Partners. In 2011 he was made a senior partner in the firm. The practice is now known as RSHP. 

The Guardian's Charlotte Higgins described Harbour's work, in comparison with fellow partner Graham Stirk, to be "more expressive and sculptural" such as Madrid airport's brightly coloured Terminal 4.

Notable works

When Harbour joined Rogers Stirk Harbour + Partners in 1985, he started as part of a team working on the Richard Rogers Lloyd's building in London. He has gone on to lead design teams on the European Court of Human Rights building, the Bordeaux Law Courts, and winning the Stirling Prize for the practice in 2006 and 2009 for Terminal 4 of Madrid-Barajas Airport and Maggie's Centre, London respectively.

Images of a selection of Ivan Harbour's work

Other projects that have been designed / led by Harbour includes: 
Barangaroo masterplan, Sydney, Australia
300 New Jersey Avenue offices, Washington DC, USA
Parc1, Seoul, South Korea
International Quarter masterplan, London.
PLACE / Ladywell, London
Nuovo Centro Civico, Scandicci, Italy

See also
 List of architects

Notes

External links
 
 Profile on the official website

Alumni of The Bartlett
1962 births
Living people
20th-century British architects
People from Irvine, North Ayrshire